El Fandi (born David Fandila Marín in Granada, Spain) is statistically one of the most skilled matadors in the world.  Currently, he is ranked number one among all bullfighters in Spain.

El Fandi was a member of Spain's national skiing team in his teenage years; however, there was a history of bullfighting in his family, and he had always loved bullfighting.  He decided to attend the Jose Antonio Martín Municipal School for Bullfighting in Almería where he learned the skills and technique of bullfighting.  He started his career as a picador in Santa Fe, near Granada and debuted as a matador in 2000.

Childhood

David Fandila Marín was born on June 13, 1981 in Granada, Spain, the son of Trinidad Marín and Juan Fandila, a banderillero, or flagman. David’s mother was in danger during the pregnancy and was encouraged to terminate the pregnancy.  However, she decided to ignore the advice and continued with the pregnancy.“It was a battle between David and Goliath,” Trinidad remembers, “that’s the reason I named him David.”

David spent his childhood living in the Albayzín, a Moorish district in Granada.  However, his parents soon moved to the Sierra Nevada Mountains where they found a steady job serving as guards in a building.  While living in this community, David and his brother, Juan Álvaro, spent time skiing in the mountains.  They specialized in Alpine Skiing and Acrobatic Skiing, but were talented in many areas of the sport. The brothers joined the Federación Española de Esquí where they competed in competitions; David left with a national title.

Bullfighting beginnings

When he was four years old, David began to practice bullfighting using papers and rags in Pradollano Square.  When he wanted to practice with the banderillas, he stuck forks in the sofa, pretending it was a bull.

‘El Fandi’ appeared for the first time in a becerrada (a bullfight with young bulls), in Armilla (Granada) on September 30, 1995.   After a couple of these small bullfights, he made his first appearance as a novillero (bullfighting apprentice) on April 19, 1998 in Santa Fe (Granada).

El Fandi faced many hardships early in his career, having to fight in many difficult bullrings, many of which were close to Madrid.  However, thanks to his agents, Antonio Rodriguez and Manolo Martín, he started to become a better bullfighter.  In 1999, he was classified as one of the top banderilleros with 60 successful bullfights.  Later in that year, he made his introduction to the world of bullfighting in the Monumental de Las Ventas in Madrid where he cut one ear from his second bull, thus earning his first prize.

El Fandi finished his bullfights in 1999 successfully.  On October 31, he killed six bulls and cut five ears.  Around this time, Emilio Miranda Casas and Santiago López began to represent El Fandi in his career.  Emilio Miranda was the well-known and prestigious manager of the bullring in Granada.  López was a retired matador, or bullfighter, and an agent to bullfighters with a lot of experience and a good reputation.  Both men believed David could be the great bullfighter Granada was waiting for; however, it would be a long road.  David needed to improve his fundamentals, Santiago López worked hard with him.

The year 2000 began with one goal in mind: El Fandi was going to become a matador in la Feria del Corpus (a weeklong fair in Granada honoring its city-saint, Corpus Christi).  However, just before his alternativa (a bullfight in which the junior bullfighter is presented to the crowd as a matador), he suffered a fracture in his right elbow in a bullfighting accident in Murcia.  However, despite the fracture, El Fandi decided to fight and become a matador on June 18, 2000.  That afternoon, while wearing protection on his right arm and fighting mainly with his left, El Fandi cut two ears and became a hero in Granada.

Professional life

2001 In 2001, El Fandi had to compete in more bullfights and in bigger bullrings.  Despite this, he triumphed again in Granada and surprised everyone with his skillful fighting, his abilities with the cape, and his powerful killing blade.  He ended 2001 competing in a total of 39 bullfights, and his average of ears per bullfight was the best of his class.

2002 The biggest test of this year for El Fandi was fighting in Las Ventas in Madrid, where he had two bullfights.  However, in his first afternoon in Madrid, El Fandi proved to the country that he was a revolutionary bullfighter.  He triumphed in important bullrings like Valencia, San Sebastián, Pamplona, Bilbao, Málaga, Murcia, Algeciras, Alicante, Badajoz and La Linea de la Concepción.  Later that year, in Granada, El Fandi experienced an incredible week of bullfighting.  He triumphed three times, lived a memorable bullfight, and then pardoned the life of a bull named Cortesano because he had shown exceptional bravery.  By the end of the year, he had competed in 74 bullfights and was known for his regularity in trophies.  He also competed in America, Mexico, and parts of South America for the first time.

2003 El Fandi’s list of trophies in 2003 were countless.  He cut one tail in a bullfight in Granada, and earned trophies in Castellón, Huelva, Santander, Zaragoza, Jaén, and many other bullrings.  He could not fight for up to a month due to a twisted ankle.  However, upon the end of 2003, El Fandi had competed in 73 fights cutting 9 tails and 120 ears.

2004 The challenge of 2004 was to compete in 100 bullfights, but in October, El Fandi decided to end with 97 bullfights.  It was one of his most important years, and the evidence was his good bullfights in the most important bullrings from Madrid, Sevilla, Valencia, Córdoba, Zaragoza, San Sebastian and Barcelona.  He again pardoned the life of a bull, this one named Sevillano.  He ended the year with 97 fights, 195 ears, 7 tails, and 59 puertas grandes.

2005 In 2005, El Fandi reached the top of his classification, participating in 104 bullfights and earning 205 ears, 10 tails, and 63 puertas grandes.  One of the most significant bullfights of his life, though, came on May 28 when he fought 6 bulls during la Feria del Corpus in Granada.  El Fandi was seriously injured by the third bull, and had to have his leg operated on for 45 minutes.  However, he returned to the bullring to kill the remaining bulls with 2 severe injuries in his leg.  He ended the day cutting 7 ears, 1 tail, and leaving through the puerta grande, leaving behind an emotional crowd, some of whom were in tears.

2006 El Fandi topped his classification again in 2006 after 108 bullfights, 221 ears, 15 tails, and 72 puertas grandes.  It was this year that El Fandi started to be sought after by all the major fairs and bullfights throughout Spain and South America.  He became one of the most famous and most popular bullfighters in the world.

2007 On June 24, 2007, El Fandi suffered an injury to his right index finger.  As a result, he lost 25 bullfights within a month and a half.  Despite this, he came back and triumphed in Barcelona, Zaragoza, and various other bullrings throughout Spain and South America.

2008 El Fandi has competed in 8 bullfights so far in 2008, cutting 19 ears and 1 tail.

El Fandi was the subject of a documentary film entitled "The Matador" which received wide critical acclaim for its cinematography, editing, and musical score. The New York Times gave the film a particularly glowing review. El Fandi killed 107 bulls in the 2005 season, and he is only the 13th bullfighter in the centuries of its history to have successfully completed over 100 corridas in one season.

He also ran the 2008 New York City Marathon.

His Cuadrilla

A cuadrilla is a bullfighter’s entourage.  It is made up of the men who help him while in the ring and those who help with his public relations.  Currently these men make up El Fandi’s cuadrilla:

Toño Matilla (Agent)
Juan Carlos Pérez Roldán. Carlos “Chicote” (Banderillero)
Oscar Padilla Bernal (Banderillero)
Basilio Martín López (Banderillero)
The banderilleros help a fighter in the ring during the second stage of the fight.  They are responsible for putting three sets of banderillas (sticks adorned with sashes) into the bull’s back.
José Manuel Gonzalez Cruz (Picador, or Lancer)
Juan de Dios Quinta Caballero (Picador)
The picadors are the men who help the matador in the first stage of the bullfight.  While the matador fights the bull with a cloak, the picadors use a lance while on horseback to test the bull and prepare him for the final performance.
Rodrigo Rufo del Castillo Monje (mozo de espadas, or sword page)
The mozo de espadas is the matador’s assistant who helps him get dressed and hands him the cape and sword during the fight.
Juan Álvaro Fandila Marín (Public Relations)
Pedro Fernández Martínez (Chauffeur)

In the media
A biographical movie titled 'The Matador' premieres at the South by Southwest Film Festival in March 2008.  The movie is directed by Stephen Higgins and Nina Gilden Seavey.  For more information, see https://web.archive.org/web/20070416072847/http://www.elfandifilm.com/.

Notes

References
http://www.el-fandi.com
https://web.archive.org/web/20070222010325/http://www.madridinfosite.com/en/entertainment/madrid-bullfighting.aspx
http://www.andalucia.com/bullfight/bullfighters/elfandi/home.htm

1981 births
Spanish bullfighters
Living people